Handlana is a village of Bhawana Tehsil in Punjab, Pakistan. It is located on the road from Bhawana to Painsra. The village has a population of 3,500(approximately).

Handlana is a sub-cast of Sial tribe, and the village is named after the tribe.

Chiniot District
Villages in Chiniot District